C39 or C-39 may refer to:

Vehicles 
Aircraft
 Caudron C.39, a French passenger biplane
 Cessna C-39, an American civil utility aircraft
 Douglas C-39, an American military transport aircraft

Ships
 , a County-class cruiser of the Royal Navy

Surface vehicles
 Alfa Romeo Racing C39, an Italian Formula One car
 GE C39-8, a diesel electric locomotive
 Marshall C39, a British bus

Other uses 
 C39 road (Namibia)
 Caldwell 39, a planetary nebula
 King's Gambit, a chess opening